Drakan: The Ancients' Gates is an action-adventure video game released in 2002 for the PlayStation 2, developed by Surreal Software and published by Sony Computer Entertainment. It is the sequel to the 1999 PC game Drakan: Order of the Flame. The game's name comes from the eponymous Ancients' Gates, which are the central focus of the story.

Gameplay 

The gameplay of Drakan: The Ancients' Gates is virtually identical to its predecessor. It is a third-person action-adventure perspective that consists of two main parts of gameplay - in the air and on the ground.

When flying mounted on Arokh, a dragon, the duo is superior to any ground enemy, but on the other hand, facing flying enemies will require a lot of maneuver and aim. Arokh can target enemies and launch powerful fireballs in their direction or a powerful breath of fire, in addition to other powers that you can acquire in the game for him. When controlling Arokh, the player has free movement in three dimensions, up and down, left and right, forward and backward

In solo, the player directly controls the main character, Rynn. Players can focus on specific enemies and perform attacks, including combo moves. Apart from that Rynn can use several weapons, including swords, axes, bows, and blunt weapons. She can also use several spells, such as Fireball, Lightning Bolt, and others.

Plot 

This game takes place sometime after the events in Order of the Flame. Rynn and Arokh answer a call from the city of Surdana. Lady Myschala of Surdana asks for Rynn and Arokh's assistance. An evil race of three-faced beings known as the Desert Lords has begun rallying the monsters from around the world (similar to how the Dark Union did in Order of the Flame) and have begun enslaving humans. Around the world, there exist four gateways that lead to the world where the dragon mother, Mala-Shae, and her brood have been slumbering since the Dark Wars. Only a Dragon of the Elder Breed can open the gates, and this is why Rynn and Arokh (more specifically, Arokh) are needed to open these gates, so that the humans can once again bond with dragons and fight back against the Desert Lords. Along the way, the two of them must go on various side quests to accomplish goals leading them to the ultimate goal.

Reception

The game received an aggregate score of 78/100 on Metacritic, based on 31 critic reviews.

References

External links
 
 Drakan: The Ancients' Gates development Post-Mortem written by designer/programmer Richard Rouse III

2002 video games
Action-adventure games
Video games about dragons
Fantasy video games
PlayStation 2 games
PlayStation 2-only games
Riot Engine games
Sony Interactive Entertainment games
Surreal Software games
Video game sequels
3D platform games
Video games developed in the United States
Video games featuring female protagonists
Single-player video games